Raúl Oscar Becerra (born 1 October 1987) is an Argentine-Chilean professional footballer who plays as a forward for Bashundhara Kings.

Club career

Deportivo Cuenca
In February 2019, Becerra returned to Deportivo Cuenca with the conviction to improve the campaign carried out in 2016. That year he played 39 official Serie A matches of the national tournament and scored 19 goals: five in the first stage and 14 in the second.

Bashundhara Kings
On 31 October 2020, Bangladesh Premier League defending champions Bashundhara Kings confirmed that Becerra will be part of the team for 2020–21 season.

On 22 December 2020, Becerra scored his first goal with Bashundhara Kings in the 2020–21 Bangladesh Federation Cup.

Personal life
His mother is a Chilean who came to Argentina at the age of 14 and his father is Argentine. Due to his Chilean heritage, in 2017 he naturalized Chilean while playing for Everton de Viña del Mar.

Honours
Boca Río Gallegos
 Liga Sur Santa Cruz (1): 2008–09

Bashundhara Kings
 Premier League (1): 2020–21
 Federation Cup (1): 2021–21

References

External links
 
 
 

1987 births
Living people
People from Río Gallegos, Santa Cruz
Argentine footballers
Naturalized citizens of Chile
Chilean footballers
Juventud Alianza players
Boca Río Gallegos footballers
Huracán de Tres Arroyos footballers
Juventud de Pergamino footballers
Club Almagro players
Nueva Chicago footballers
Argentinos Juniors footballers
Club Atlético Colón footballers
C.D. Cuenca footballers
Everton de Viña del Mar footballers
Deportes Iquique footballers
Umm Salal SC players
Bashundhara Kings players
Torneo Argentino C players
Torneo Argentino B players
Torneo Argentino A players
Primera B Metropolitana players
Primera Nacional players
Argentine Primera División players
Ecuadorian Serie A players
Chilean Primera División players
Qatar Stars League players
Bangladesh Football Premier League players
Argentine expatriate footballers
Expatriate footballers in Chile
Argentine expatriate sportspeople in Chile
Expatriate footballers in Ecuador
Argentine expatriate sportspeople in Ecuador
Expatriate footballers in Qatar
Argentine expatriate sportspeople in Qatar
Expatriate footballers in Bangladesh
Argentine expatriate sportspeople in Bangladesh
Chilean expatriate footballers
Chilean expatriate sportspeople in Ecuador
Chilean expatriate sportspeople in Qatar
Chilean expatriate sportspeople in Bangladesh
Argentine sportspeople of Chilean descent
Citizens of Chile through descent
Chilean people of Argentine descent
Association football forwards